La Petite Rivière (English: The Little River) is a tributary of the Cami River, flowing in the unorganized territory of Lalemant and in the municipality from Rivière-Éternité, in the Fjord-du-Saguenay, in the administrative region of Saguenay-Lac-Saint-Jean, in the province of Quebec, in Canada. The course of "La Petite Rivière" crosses the zec du Lac-Brébeuf.

The valley of "La Petite Rivière" is served on most of its course by a forest road, for forestry and recreational tourism activities. Some secondary forest roads serve this valley.

Forestry is the main economic activity in the sector; recreational tourism, second.

The surface of "La Petite Rivière" is usually frozen from the beginning of December to the end of March, however the safe circulation on the ice is generally made from mid-December to mid-March.

Geography 
The main neighboring watersheds of "La Petite Rivière" are:
 north side: Lac de la Tente, Lac Belly, Lac Potvin, Brébeuf Lake, Lac des Cèdres, Éternity Lake, Éternité River, Truite Lake, Saguenay River;
 east side: Cami River, Saint-Jean River, Rivière à la Catin, Lac des Hauteurs;
 south side: Lac de la Grosse Femelle, Lac Charny, Lac Éloigné, Épinglette Stream, Malbaie River, Caribou brook, Desprez Lake, Porc-Épic River;
 west side: lac à la Boule, lac du Berger, lac Grand-Père, Ha! Ha! River, Bras d'Hamel, rivière à Mars.

"La Petite Rivière" rises at the confluence of an unidentified lake located between the mountains. This source is located at:
  southwest of a mountain peak which reaches ;
  east of Lac du Berger, which is a head water body of the Bras de Ross (Brébeuf Lake);
  north-west of "Lac de la Grosse Femelle";
  south-west of the confluence of "La Petite Rivière" and the Cami River;
  south-east of "Lac des Cèdres";
  north-east of the dike at the mouth of Lake Ha! Ha!;
  north-west of the confluence of the ruisseau à John and the Malbaie River.

  southward down a mountain, up to a bend in the river;
  to the east, to the outlet (coming from the north) of "Lac de la Tente";
  to the east in a deep valley, forming a detour south to the outlet (coming from the north) of a stream;
  to the east in a deep valley, forming a hook towards the south, to its mouth.

The "Petite Rivière" flows onto the west bank of the Cami River. This mouth is located at:
  southeast of Belly Lake;
  north-west of Desprez Lake which is the head lake of the Cami River;
  north of the confluence of John's Creek and the Malbaie River;
  south-west of the confluence of the Cami River with the Saint-Jean River;
  south-west of the village center of Rivière-Éternité;
  south-west of the confluence of the Saint-Jean River and the Saint-Jean Bay (Saguenay River);
  south-east of downtown Saguenay (city).

From the confluence of "La Petite Rivière", the current:
 follows the course of the Cami River on  generally towards the northeast;
 follows the course of the Saint-Jean River on  generally towards the northeast;
 follows the course of the Saguenay River on  eastward to Tadoussac where it merges with the Saint Lawrence estuary.

Toponymy 
The toponym "La Petite Rivière" was formalized on November 9, 2000, by the Commission de toponymie du Québec.

Notes and references

Related articles 

 Le Fjord-du-Saguenay Regional County Municipality
 Lalemant
 Éternité River
 Zec du Lac-Brébeuf
 Cami River
 Saint-Jean River
 Saguenay River
 List of rivers of Quebec

External links 

Rivers of Saguenay–Lac-Saint-Jean
Le Fjord-du-Saguenay Regional County Municipality